Hechtia stenopetala is a species of bromeliad plant that is endemic to Mexico.

Synonyms
 Hechtia besseriana Verschaff.
 Hechtia cordylinoides Baker

References

 The Plant List entry
 Encyclopedia of Life entry

stenopetala